Referendums in the Philippines are occasionally held at a national, regional or local level. Referendums can either by national or local in scope. In the Philippines, "referendums" and "plebiscites" mean different things.

Referendum vs. plebiscite 
According to the Initiative and Referendum Act, a referendum is "the power of the electorate to approve or reject a legislation through an election called for the purpose." A plebiscite, on the other hand, is "the electoral process by which an initiative on the Constitution is approved or rejected by the people."

The constitution also mandates a referendum for these instances:

 Adoption of a new name for the country, or a new national anthem or a new seal
 Allowing foreign military troops in the Philippines if Congress requires

The constitution requires a plebiscite for these:

 Creation, division, merger, abolishment or major boundary changes of a province, city, municipality or barangay (village).
 Creation of special metropolitan political subdivisions
 Creation of autonomous regions
 Approval of an amendment or revision to the constitution

The Initiative and Referendum Act allows for referendums on these cases:

 A petition of at least 10% of registered voters, with 3% within every legislative district for local initiatives
 If there is only one legislative district in a province, city or municipality, it has to be 3% within each municipality in a province, or each barangay in a city
 For barangay initiatives, it has to be at least 10% of registered voters
 A local legislative body can also submit to the electorate approval of any ordinance or resolution

The Initiative and Referendum Act allows for plebiscites on these cases:

 A petition of at least 12% of registered voters, with 3% within every legislative district, for amending the constitution
However, the Supreme Court declared the Initiative and Referendum Act procedures for amending the constitution as fatally defective, although it did not affect the operation of the law for other types of initiatives.

Administration 
Referendums and plebiscites, just like other electoral exercises, are administered by the Commission on Elections.

National referendums

Spanish colonial period 
In 1599, King Philip II of Spain ordered a referendum in several areas to confirm Spanish sovereignty in the islands. It was approved.

American colonial period 
In 1935, the first national plebiscite was held, for the ratification of the 1935 constitution. This was seen as an independence referendum, and those in favor of adoption the constitution overwhelmingly outnumbered those who were opposed.

Two years later, a plebiscite asked women if they wanted suffrage for themselves. Unlike other referendums, 300,000 votes to the affirmative were needed; Filipino women turned out in droves, with more than 447,000 voting for suffrage.

Two years later, a plebiscite asked the people about economic adjustments. These were amendments to the Tydings–McDuffie Act. The people overwhelmingly approved the amendments.

In 1940, a plebiscite asked three questions to the people. These were amendments to the constitution that restored the bicameral Congress, allowed the re-election of the president, and created the Commission on Elections. The people approved all three, but not as overwhelmingly as the 1935 and 1939 plebiscites.

Third Republic 
The Americans granted independence to the Philippines on July 4, 1946. Prior to that, Congress passed Commonwealth Act No. 733, the local version of the Bell Trade Act passed by the United States Congress, which include parity rights for both Filipino and American citizens to exploit Philippine natural resources. As this meant amending the constitution, a plebiscite was called after it was passed by the Philippine Congress by much difficulty. Turnout was low, but the measure was approved by the people by a 5:1 margin.

By 1967, there were moves to revise the constitution. Congress passed amendments to the constitution where it increased the number of congressmen, and allowed incumbent members of Congress to sit in the incoming constitutional convention. In a plebiscite held together with the 1967 Senate election, the people overwhelmingly rejected both questions. This was the only time the government lost. A constitutional convention was elected in 1970, and new constitution was put to a plebiscite in 1973.

Martial law and Fourth Republic 
President Ferdinand Marcos declared martial law on September 23, 1972. Martial law prevented Congress to convene. The constitutional convention presented to him the draft constitution by December 1972. Meanwhile, some senators have been organizing to convene on the supposed resumption of Congress by January 22, 1973. Marcos then created barangay or citizens' assemblies. These assemblies, instead of via secret ballot, voted via showing of hands on the new constitution, and whether to hold another plebiscite for approving the constitution, from January 10 to 15, 1973. The citizens' assemblies overwhelmingly approved the constitution, and voted not to hold another plebiscite.

Marcos had several more referendums, all being voted by citizens' assemblies, and won on overwhelming margins.

Fifth Republic 
Marcos was overthrown after the People Power Revolution, where he was alleged to have cheated during the 1986 presidential election. Corazon Aquino, Marcos's opponent, became president, and did away with the 1973 constitution. She appointed a constitutional commission that drafted a new constitution. This was then approved by the people in a plebiscite in a margin of more than 3:1.

Local plebiscites 
Local plebiscites have mostly been for the creation, inclusion to, or division of new autonomous regions, provinces, cities, municipalities and barangays. A group of cities and municipalities (most usually a legislative district) that aim to become provinces have provincehood plebiscites. Municipalities which aim to become cities have cityhood plebiscites, a cluster of barangays which aim to become municipalities have incorporation plebiscites, and a sitio, purok or neighborhood which aim to be come barangays have barangay creation plebiscites. There has also been a plebiscite for renaming a province, and for transferring a provincial capital from one municipality or city to another.

The constitution says that there are two autonomous regions: in Muslim Mindanao and the Cordillera. Three successful plebiscites in Mindanao have led to the creation of the present-day Bangsamoro via a 2019 plebiscite. In the Cordillera, two plebiscites have failed, the latest in 1998, and it is still treated as a regular administrative region.

This is a list of local plebiscites for the provincial and regional levels.

People's Initiative 

People's Initiative refers to either a mode for constitutional amendment provided by the 1987 Philippine Constitution or to the act of pushing an initiative (national or local) allowed by the Initiative and Referendum Act of 1987.

While there had been no national people's initiatives, there had been several attempts of one. In 2014, the People's Initiative against pork barrel had 10,000 signatures submitted to the Commission on Elections, but a referendum didn't push through. In 2020, it was theorized that it can be used to grant ABS-CBN a new franchise, but was seen by lawyer Emil Marañon "as legally problematic and practically impossible to hold."

Local initiatives are possible. The first initiative under the Initiative and Referendum Act was in Barangay Miragrosa, Quezon City stopping the continued influx of informal settlers and the sale of illegal drugs in 2011. The initiative passed, with 465 in favor and 384 against, out of 3,665 registered voters eligible to participate.

References